Zakariyau Idrees-Oboh Oseni, (born 20 December 1950) is a prominent Arabic and Islamic Studies Scholar, an Imam and a poet from Nigeria. He was trained at the University of Ibadan where he obtained a Certificate in Arabic & Islamic Studies (1971), B. A. First Class Hons. in Arabic Language and Literature (1977), M. A. in Arabic & Islamic Studies (1980) and PhD. in Arabic Language & Literature (1984). He has over 33 years' experience in lecturing in Arabic Studies and aspects of Islamic Studies. He has over 100 publications in Arabic, Islamic Studies and Literature out of which are three collections of poems in English, three plays and a collection of short stories in Arabic, and a collection of Afenmai Proverbs translated and annotated. He is an editorial consultant to fifteen academic journals in Nigeria and beyond. He was the Head of the multidisciplinary Department of Religions (1997–1999) and the Department of Arabic (2008–2009), University of Ilorin. Not only that, but he served as a Visiting Professor and Head, Department of Languages, Al-Hikmah University, Ilorin, from October 2011 to October 2012. He also served as the Dean, Faculty of Arts, University of Ilorin, Ilorin  from 2009 to 2011. He is currently the Head of Department of Arabic, University of Ilorin. Furthermore, he is the Chief Imam and Waziri of Auchi. Moreover, he is a Fellow of Arabic Studies, Nigeria (FASN), Fellow of the Academy of Religion (FAR) and member of the Consultative Committee of 'Ulama' under the Nigerian Supreme Council for Islamic Affairs. He is happily married with children.

Early life and education
Born on 20 December 1950, Oseni had his first significant Islamic and western education from his late father, Malam Idrees Oboh-Oseni and his grandmother late Madam Aishietu Oseni respectively. Being the son of a Shaykh, Oseni had the uncommon opportunity of learning the fundamentals of as well as different disciplines of Arabic and Islamic studies directly from his father. He later proceeded to the Primary School of the Mid-West Regional government where he obtained the Primary School Living Certificate, Grade 'A’ Pass in 1963. This got him into the Ansar-Ud-Deen Secondary Modern School where he obtained the Secondary Modern School Certificate in 1966. In spite of being the first in class in his previous studies, he could not proceed to Grammar School as he was scheduled to undertake more rigorous studies in Arabic and Islamic studies. He resumed at the El-Adabiyyah School for Studies, Owo in 1967. After the first year, he got double promotion and still maintained his "First Position" in class. He concluded the I'dadi (Intermediate) Certificate in Arabic and Islamic Studies in 1969 and was employed in the same school. Therefore, between January and August 1970, he was a Tutor at the El-Adabiyyah School for Arabic Studies in Owo in the defunct Western region. In June 1971, he completed the Teacher's Certificate Course in Arabic and Islamic Studies at the University of Ibadan with Distinction. In preparation for the Bachelor programme, he enrolled for both Ordinary and Advanced Levels of the General Certificate Examination in the same year in 1973 and passed both with excellent grades. This formally brought him into the University academic life. In 1977, he completed his Bachelor of Arts degree in Arabic Language and Literature with First Class Honours. During his National Youth Service Corps (NYSC) programme, he was appointed as a Graduate Assistant in Arabic Department, Bayero University Kano between September 1977 and July 1978. Barely two months after his NYSC programme, he got employed as an Assistant Lecturer, Arabic Studies in the Department of Religions, University of Ilorin. In 1979, he enrolled for the Masters programme in Arabic and Islamic Studies at the University of Ibadan, which he concluded on 30 September 1980. In his unending quest for knowledge, he enrolled for the doctoral programme in Arabic language and literature at the University of Ibadan in 1981 with speciality in Arabic Literary History and Textual Criticism of the Early Islamic and Umayyad Poetry. He concluded his doctoral programme in July 1984 –few months after the demise of his father, Malam Idrees-Oboh.

Arabic literature in West Africa
As one of the leading scholars of Arabic literature in West Africa, Prof. Oseni authored the first published original play in Arabic titled al-'Amid al-Mubajjal (The Honourable Dean) in 1994. Several editions of the play have been published subsequently. Prof. Oseni further published two other Plays titled Al-Tajir wa Sahib al-Mat'am (The Trader and the Owner of the Restaurant) (2005) and Al-Tabaqat al-Ulya (The Upper Class) (2007). With the leading role of Prof. Oseni, many young scholars of Arabic language and literature are now increasingly interested in Arabic drama. This is justified by the surge in the number of Arabic plays that have been published in Nigeria and beyond. On 31 January 2002, he delivered the 53rd University of Ilorin Inaugural Lecture on Prose and Drama in Nigerian Literature in Arabic. The 53-page lecture attracted audiences from far and wide. Prof. Oseni also has a collection of short stories in Arabic Qisas Khatt al-Istiwa'I (The Equatorial Line Stories) .

Another major contribution to Arabic literature in West Africa and indeed the whole Arab world is his book, AI-Ma'dubat al-Adabiyyah li-tullab al-cArabiyyah fi ifriqiya al-Gharbiyyah (A Literary Banquet for Arabic Students in West Africa). Several editions and prints of this book have been released since its first release in the year 2000. His latest publication, which relates to Arabic literature generally, is a book on Al-Hajjaj ibn Yusuf Al-Thaqafi: A Formidable Umayyad Viceroy in Iraq (2011). The book was published by A.S. Noordeen Publishers in Kuala Lumpur, Malaysia and has attracted a wide readership across the world.

As an English poet

Apart from his Arabic and Islamic studies scholarship, Prof. Oseni is an accomplished English poet. He has been writing poems in English since 1973. His uncommon poetic genius led to the publication of three collections of poems. The first collection Sparks in the Dark was published in 2001. The second collection, The Silver Lining was published in 2004. A third collection of poems was published in 2011, while the fourth collection, The Superb, Graceful Mama and other Poems was published in 2015. He also published a collection of Afenmai Proverbs, which he translated and annotated.

Oseni's Imamship role
As a son of one of the then leading Islamic scholars in Auchi city, Prof. Oseni has been exposed to both traditional and modern methods of learning Arabic and Islamic studies at an early age as his father, the late Mallam Oboh, taught Arabic and Islamic studies to the local mallams at his residence. Oseni was appointed and turbaned as the Chief Imam of Auchi by the Otaru of Auchi on Friday, 24 August 2007. About five years before that, he was installed as the Waziri of Auchi (the prime advisor to the Auchi Monarch), by His Royal Highness, Alhaji Aliru Momoh, the otaru of Auchi. The turbaning ceremony took place on 7 December 2003. At present, he is the Chief Imam and Waziri of Auchi.

Given his traditional background in Arabic and Islamic sciences and his spiritual devotion, Prof. Oseni has written and published scores of prayer books for supplication to Allah. As a spiritual mentor of many, he lives a simple life in a humble manner. His Imamship role further consolidated his candid efforts to encourage people to supplicate to Allah at all times.

Philosophy of life
As an advocate of peaceful coexistence, Prof. Oseni has continued to preach unity, tolerance and mutual understanding among people of diverse religions and ethnic origins. His philosophy about life is "live and let's live". He has practically demonstrated this in his research works as well as his practical life. He has mentored scores of academics of diverse religions.

Publications
Oseni is an accomplished writer whose publications are listed on international library collections. A select list can be found on his University of Ilorin website.

References

Sources
 Afenmai proverbs
 University of Ilorin Newsletter
 The concept of temptation and its solu
 African Studies Center
 

1950 births
Nigerian Muslims
Nigerian poets
Living people
People from Auchi